"J'imagine" is a song by French singer Valentina, released as a single on 16 October 2020. The song's lyrics deal with the isolation and separation caused by measures due to the COVID-19 pandemic. 

It was France's winning entry at the 2020 Junior Eurovision Song Contest held in Poland on 29 November. Valentina, aged 11 at the time, won the competition with a total of 200 points, 48 points ahead of second-placed Kazakhstan, earning France its first victory at the contest.

Composition 
The song was written by Igit and Barbara Pravi, who also wrote France's entry for the Junior Eurovision Song Contest 2019, "". Pravi would later represent France in the Eurovision Song Contest 2021 with the song "".

The head of the French delegation to the 2020 Junior Eurovision, Alexandra Redde-Amiel, described "J'imagine" as "a sparkling, very positive song that will allow us to imagine ourselves in a world of tomorrow full of joy and life". Its lyrics deal with the isolation and separation caused by measures due to the COVID-19 pandemic. The singer invites the listeners to imagine a brighter future with her:

Valentina's favorite part of the song is:

As Valentina explained, this part of the song "reflects reality — life is not always easy and fun — but yet has a strong hopeful message at the end: imagining together a brighter future". She likes singing this part "because it's a mellow moment of the song that contrasts with the rest of the track, and it finishes with a high note that [she] really like[s] to reach."

Junior Eurovision Song Contest

Selection, announcement and release 
On 9 October 2020, France Télévisions announced that it had selected Valentina with her song to represent France at the Eurovision Junior Song Contest organized in Warsaw, Poland, on 29 November.

According to Alexandra Redde-Amiel, Valentina and her song were chosen from around twenty candidates: “We had around twenty proposals, either songs on their own or songs carried by an artist. But Valentina arrived with her sparkling little eyes and her optimistic message. We fell in love, the choice was obvious."

On 16 October, the song was released as a single. The music video, which was shot in Orléans, was unveiled on the same day.

Victory 
On 29 November, Valentina won the contest, scoring 200 points. Kazakhstan's entry came in second, receiving 152 points, while Spain's 133 points put them in third. This was France's first victory in the contest.

Track listing

References

External links 
 

2020 songs
French-language songs
Junior Eurovision Song Contest 2020
Junior Eurovision Song Contest winning songs
Songs written by Barbara Pravi
Songs about the COVID-19 pandemic
Junior Eurovision songs
Valentina (singer) songs